Hanuman Garhi is a 10th-century temple of Hanuman in Uttar Pradesh, India. Located in Ayodhya, it is one of the most important temples in the city along with other temples such as Nageshwar Nath and the under-construction Ram Mandir. It is a custom that before visiting the Ram Mandir, one should first pay a visit to Hanuman Garhi. The temple houses Hanuman's mother, Anjani, with a young Hanuman sitting on her lap. This shrine is under the charge of Bairagi Mahants of Ramanandi Sampradaya and Nirvani Akhara.

History
Hanuman Garhi temple is located near Ram Janmabhoomi. In 1855, the Nawab of Awadh BUILT the temple. Historian Sarvepalli Gopal has said that the 1855 dispute was not for the Ayodhya temple dispute but for the Hanuman Garhi temple.

Festivals
Hanuman Jayanti
Bada Mangal
Rama Navami
Dussehra
Deepawali

References

External links
 Hanumangarhi Temple Ayodhya - The Divine India

Hanuman temples
Hindu temples in Uttar Pradesh
Ayodhya